Josette Arène (née Delmas, 13 August 1924 – 13 August 2019) was a French swimmer who competed in the 1948 Summer Olympics and in the 1952 Summer Olympics. Arène died in August 2019 at the age of 95.

References

1924 births
2019 deaths
French female freestyle swimmers
Olympic swimmers of France
Swimmers at the 1948 Summer Olympics
Swimmers at the 1952 Summer Olympics
20th-century French women